Beur Central Jail is the main prison of Bihar state of India and is located in Patna. It is one of the largest prison in India, headed by Shri Jitendra Kumar (BPrS). He is also known to control the illegal activities inside the prison. Kumar is a 1995 batch officer and has experience of working as the Central Jail superintendent for more than 10 years. He is considered a no nonsense cop. He is previously served as the superintendent of Sub jail Ghatsheela, Sub jail Arariya, District jail Katihar, Biharshariff and Begusarai. He has also worked as the Circle superintendent of Bhagalpur Spl Central jail, Purnia Central jail and Muzaffarpur Central jail.

As a father of two, Mr Kumar loves spending time with his sons- Aryan and Veer.

See also

List of prisons in India

References

Prisons in India
Buildings and structures in Patna